Rick and Morty: The Anime is a Japanese–American anime science fiction sitcom created and developed by Takashi Sano and produced by Sola Entertainment and Telecom Animation Film for Adult Swim. The third series in the franchise, based on the animated series of the same name by Justin Roiland and Dan Harmon, and starring Yōhei Tadano and Keisuke Chiba as Rick Sanchez and Morty Smith, following five pilot short films released from March 29, 2020 to October 10, 2021.

Plot
The show revolves around the adventures of the members of the Smith household, in particular mad scientist and samurai Rick Sanchez, and his grandchildren, the 14-year-old Morty Smith, and the 17-year-old Summer Smith, whose parents, Jerry and Beth Smith (Rick's daughter), disapprove of their adventures.

Different versions of the characters (including the bespectacled genocider, President Morty Smith) inhabit other dimensions throughout the show's multiverse, with their personal characteristics varying from one reality to another.

Cast

Main
 Yōhei Tadano as Rick Sanchez
 Keisuke Chiba as Morty Smith
 Manabu Muraji as Jerry Smith
 Akiha Matsui as Summer Smith
 Jun Irie as Beth Smith

Guest
 Manabu Muraji as AI Driver and Hologram Transvestite
 Yuki Minami as Hologram Girl
 Hinata Tadokoro, Daiki Kobayashi, Hodaka Mieno, Nanami Yamashita, and Kazuya Saji as Future Beings

Episodes

Short films (2020–21)

Production
A six-minute short film titled Samurai & Shogun aired unannounced on Adult Swim's Toonami programming block on March 29, 2020, during the hiatus of the fourth season of Rick and Morty, before being uploaded to Adult Swim's YouTube channel the following day. Written and directed by Kaichi Sato, and produced by Koji Iijima and Studio Deen and executive producer Maki Terashima-Furuta, the episode features a different animation and art style than usual, and is heavily themed around anime, specifically Lone Wolf & Cub. The short stars Yōhei Tadano as "Rick WTM-72" and Keisuke Chiba as "Shogun Morty", the pair reprising their roles from the Japanese dub of the animated series.

Another eight-minute short film titled Rick & Morty vs. Genocider aired unannounced on Toonami on July 26, 2020, debuting on YouTube slightly after. Written and directed by Takashi Sano, produced by Sola Entertainment, animated at Telecom Animation Film, and starring Tadano and Chiba as Rick and Morty, Manabu Muraji as Jerry, "AI Driver", and "Hologram Transvestite", and Yuki Minami as "Hologram Girl", the episode explores the conflict between President Morty and Rick C-137.

A third short film, titled Summer Meets God (Rick Meets Evil) and also written and directed by Takashi Sano, was released on YouTube on August 2, 2021 and aired on Adult Swim the following day. A fourth short film, titled The Great Yokai Battle of Akihabara, directed by Masaru Matsumoto and written by Naohiro Fukushima, was released on YouTube on October 10, 2021 and aired on Adult Swim the following day.

A fifth short film, titled Samurai and Shogun Part 2 and featuring the return of Samurai & Shogun'''s Kaichi Sato as writer and director, was released on YouTube on November 12, 2021 as part of the 2021 Adult Swim Festival. Consequentially, on May 18, 2022, due to the positive reception of the previous five films, Adult Swim ordered a 10-episode anime series of Rick and Morty: The Anime'', directed by Takashi Sano and from Telecom Animation.

Release
The series will premiere on Adult Swim in 2023.

Notes

References

External links
 
 
 
 
 

Rick and Morty
Rick and Morty short films
Science fiction anime and manga
Science fiction television shows
Television shows set in Japan
TMS Entertainment
Upcoming anime television series